Raphael is a name of Hebrew origin, from rāp̄ā ( "he has healed") and ēl ( "God"). Popularized in Western Europe, it can be spelled Raphael, Raphaël, Rafael, Raffael, Raffaello, Raffiel, Refoel, Raffaele, or Refael depending on the language.

The name is attested as far back as c. 1350 BC, appearing in a letter of Pabi, Prince of Lachish in center Israel, to Pharaoh Akhenaton ("Now have I sent you Rapha-el.").

Translations 
 Amharic: ሩፋኤል (Rufael)
 Arabic: رفائيل‎ (Rāfāʿīl)
 Armenian: Ռաֆայել (Ṙafayel)
 Azerbaijani: Rafael
 Belarusian: Рафаэль (Rafaeĺ)
 Bengali: রাফায়েল (Rāphāẏēla)
 Brazilian: Rafael
 Catalan: Rafel
 Cebuano: Rapáel
 Chamorro: Rafet
 Chinese Simplified: 拉斐尔 (Lā fěi ěr)
 Chinese Traditional: 拉斐爾 (Lā fěi ěr)
 Coptic: Ⲣⲁⲫⲁⲏⲗ (Rapha’êl)
 Czech: Rafael
 Esperanto: Rafaelo
 Finnish: Rafael
 French: Raphaël 
 German: Raphael
 Greek: Ραφαήλ (Rafaī́l)
 Gujarati: રાફેલ (Rāphēla)
 Hebrew: רפאל (Rafa'el)
 Hindi: रफएल (Rapha'ēla)
 Italian: Raffaello, Raffaele
 Japanese: ラファエル (Rafaeru)
 Kannada: ರಾಫೆಲ್ (Rāphel)
 Korean: 라파엘 (Lapael)
 Latin: Raphael
 Lithuanian: Rapolas
 Macedonian: Рафаел (Rafael)
 Maltese: Rafel
 Montenegrin: Rafailo (Рафаило), Rafail (Рафаил)
 Malayalam: റപ്പായേൽ (Rāppāēl)
 Mongolian: Рафаэль (Rafaeli)
 Nepali: रफाएल (Raphā'ēla)
 Old Norse: Raife, also nickname ''Raðulfr''
 Norwegian: Rafael
 Persian: رافائل (Rāfāel)
 Polish: Rafał
 Portuguese: Rafael
 Punjabi: ਰਾਫਾਈਲ (Rāphā'īla)
 Romanian: Rafael
 Russian: Рафаил (Rafail)
 Serbian: Рафаило (Rafailo)
 Slovenian: Rafael
 Spanish: Rafael (Rafa'el)
 Tagalog: Rafael, also nickname "Paeng"
 Tamil: ரபேல் (Rapēl)
 Telugu: రాఫెల్ (Rāphel)
 Thai: ราฟาเอล (Rā fā xel)
 Ukrainian: Рафаїл (Rafaīl)
 Urdu: رافائيل‎ (Rāfāʿēl)

Raphael
Raphael (archangel), an archangel in Judaism, Christianity, and Islam, after whom all or most other uses are named

Mononym 
Raphael, or Raffaello Sanzio (1483–1520), Italian master painter and architect in the High Renaissance
Rafael (footballer, born 1990), a Brazilian football player who plays for Lyon
Raphael (singer) (born 1943), Spanish singer
Raphael (musician) (born 1948), American musician
Raphael of Brooklyn (1860–1915), a saint in the Christian Orthodox tradition
Raphael of Lesbos (died 1463), Eastern Orthodox saint, see Saints Raphael, Nicholas and Irene of Lesbos
Patriarch Raphael I of Constantinople, Patriarch from 1475 to 1476
Patriarch Raphael II of Constantinople, Patriarch from 1603 to 1607
pseudonym of Robert Cross Smith (1795–1832)

Birth 
Raphael Abramovitch (1880–1963), Russian bundist and communist politician
Raphael Sylvanus Amegashie (1927-2013), Ghanaian entrepreneur, accountant, and politician
Raphael Benjamin (1846–1906), British-born Australian and American rabbi
Raphael I Bidawid (1922–2003), Patriarch of the Chaldean Catholic Church in 1989–2003 
Raphael Bob-Waksberg (born 1984), American comedian, writer and creator of BoJack Horseman
Raphael Botti (born 1982), Brazilian footballer
Raphael Chukwu (born 1975), Nigerian football (soccer) player
Raphael Hayyim Isaac Carregal (1733—1777), itinerant Palestinian rabbi and preacher
Raphael Davis (born 1976), American mixed martial artist
Raphael Gray (born 1981), British computer hacker
Raphael Gualazzi (born 1981), Italian singer and pianist
Raphael Holinshed (1529–1580), English chronicler
Raphael Holzdeppe (born 1989), German pole vaulter
Raphael Kalinowski (1835–1907), Polish saint in the Discalced Carmelite Order
Raphael Koster (born 1971), American game designer
Raphael Lemkin, Holocaust survivor
Raphael Martelli (1811–1880), first Catholic priest in Toodyay, Western Australia
Raphael Matos (born 1981), Brazilian racing driver
Rafael "Rafi" Menco (born 1994), Israeli basketball player for Hapoel Holon in the Israeli Basketball Premier League
Raphael Ohin (born 1995), Ghanaian footballer
Raphael M. Quaye (born 1975), Liberian basketball player
Raphael Saadiq (born 1966), American singer, songwriter, musician, guitarist, and record producer
Raphael Schäfer (born 1979), German footballer
Raphael Semmes (1809–1877), officer in the United States Navy from 1826 to 1860 and the Confederate States Navy from 1860 to 1865
Raphael Warnock (born 1969), American pastor and U.S. Senator from Georgia

Fictional characters 
 Raphael, one of the four Teenage Mutant Ninja Turtles
 Raphael Kirsten, a fictional character in the video game Fire Emblem: Three Houses
Raphael Sorel, a fictional character in Soulcalibur series of video games

Raphaël
Raphaël is a French masculine given name.
Raphaël Alibert (1887–1963), French politician
Raphaël Astier (born 1976), French modern pentathlete
Raphaël Bohren (born 1984), Swiss figure skater
Raphaël Bretton (1920–2011), French set decorator
Raphaël Chaume, French rugby union player
Raphaël Domjan, Swiss explorer
Raphaël Enthoven, French philosopher
Raphaël Garcia (born 1999), Canadian soccer player
Raphaël Géminiani (born 1925), French road bicycle racer
Raphaël Haroche (born 1975), French singer, known by the mononym Raphaël
Raphaël Ibañez (born 1973), French rugby union footballer
Raphaël Jacquelin (born 1974), French professional golfer
Raphaël Lakafia(born 1988), French rugby union player
Raphaël Lévy, trading card game 
Raphaël Martinetti, Swiss businessman and President of the International Federation of Associated Wrestling Styles
Raphaël Nadé (born 1980), Ivory Coast / French football (soccer) player
Raphaël Nadjari (born 1971), French-Israeli writer and film and television director
Raphaël Piolanti (born 1967), French hammer thrower
Raphaël Poirée (born 1974), French biathlete
Raphaël Poulain (born 1980), French rugby union player
Raphaël Pujazon (1918–2000), French athlete and Olympian
Raphaël Rouquier (born 1969), French mathematician
Raphaël Salem (1898–1963), Greek-Sephardic mathematician
Raphaël Schellenberger (born 1990), French politician
Raphaël Varane (born 1993), French football (soccer) player
Raphaël Wicky (born 1977), Swiss football (soccer) player

Rafael
Rafael Caro Quintero, Mexican drug lord
Rafael Correa, president of Ecuador
Rafael Edward Cruz, given name of U.S. politician Ted Cruz
Rafael Eitan, Israeli general, former Chief of Staff of the Israel Defense Forces, and politician
Rafael Trujillo, former Dominican president (dictator)

Arts 
Rafael Castillo, Mexican-American editor, author, academician
Rafael Arevalo, Mexican-American Composer
Rafael Bittencourt, Brazilian power metal composer and songwriter
Rafael Frühbeck de Burgos (1933-2014), Spanish conductor and composer
Rafael Kayanan, Filipino - American artist 
Raffaello da Urbino (1483–1520), known as Raphael, Italian painter

Television 
Rafael Araneda, Chilean television personality
Rafael L. Silva, Brazilian-American actor

Sports 
Rafael Alarçón, Brazilian squash player
Rafael Alkorta, Spanish former footballer
 Rafael Álvarez (baseball) (born 1977), Venezuelan baseball player
 Rafael Álvarez (diver) (born 1971), Spanish diver
Rafael Arevalo, Salvadoran tennis player
Rafael Benítez, Spanish football manager
Rafael Carbonell, Cuban flyweight boxer
Rafael Dudamel, Venezuelan football manager and former player who played as a goalkeeper
Rafael Márquez, Mexican footballer
Rafael Medina, Mexican footballer
Rafael Mea Vitali, Venezuelan football defender
Rafael Montiel, Colombian road cyclist
Rafael Nadal, Spanish tennis player
Rafael Nepomuceno, Filipino bowler
Rafael Palmeiro, Major League Baseball player
Rafael Pascual, Spanish volleyball player
Rafael Ramos, Puerto Rican boxer
Rafael Romero, Venezuelan track and field athlete
Rafael van der Vaart, Dutch footballer
Rafael Zuñiga, Colombian boxer
Rafael dos Anjos, Brazilian mixed martial artist

Brazilian footballers 
Rafael Araújo Silva (1988), currently playing for Corinthians
Rafael Cabral Barbosa (1990), currently playing for Napoli
Rafael Godoi Pereira (1985), currently playing for FK Laktaši
Rafael Pires Vieira (1978), currently playing for Mikkelin Kissat
Rafael Pereira da Silva (footballer born 1980), retired former footballer
Rafael Pereira da Silva (footballer born 1990), currently playing for Lyon
Rafael Schmitz (1980), currently playing for Valenciennes
Rafael Silva Nascimento (1984), currently playing for Vasco
Rafael Sóbis (1985), currently playing for Internacional
Rafael Vágner Dias Silva (1983), currently playing for Náutico

Saints 
Rafael Arnáiz Barón, Spanish saint
Rafael Guizar Valencia, Mexican saint

Fictional characters (Movies, TV Show & etc) 
 Rafael Barba, (Raúl Esparza) appearing on Law & Order: Special Victims Unit
 Rafael Cuevas, the main protagonist appeared in Benjamin Pascual's novel Lalaki sa Dilim (lit. A Man In The Dark)
 Rafael Solano, (Justin Baldoni), a principal character on Jane the Virgin
 Rafael, a toucan character in the animated film Rio, played by George Lopez
Dr. Rafael Salazar, the late Argentinian father of the titular character of the 2010-2013 Cartoon Network show Generator Rex.

Raphiael
Raphiael Putney (born 1990), American basketball player for Maccabi Haifa of the Israeli National League

See also
Raphael (surname)
Raphael (disambiguation)
Rafael (disambiguation)
Saint Raphael (disambiguation)

References

Given names
Spanish masculine given names
French masculine given names
Theophoric names
Hebrew masculine given names
English masculine given names

es:Rafael (nombre)
fr:Raphaël
no:Rafael